FabricLive.58 is a 2011 DJ mix album by Goldie. The album was released as part of the FabricLive Mix Series.

Track listing
  Rido feat. Thomas Oliver - Twisted - Metalheadz
  Marcus Intalex feat. S. P. Y. - Celestial Navigation - Soul:r
  Lenzman - Lasers - Metalheadz
  Need For Mirrors - Lofar - Metalheadz
  Enei - One Chance VIP - Critical
  Subwave & Enei - The Mines - Metalheadz
  S.I.N. & Mutated Forms - Right Now - Spearhead
  Fresh - The Gatekeeper - Ram
  DJ Hazard - Proteus - Playaz
  Critical Impact & Komonazmuk - Translation - Metalheadz
  Adam F - Metropolis - Metalheadz
  Mutated Forms - Crowlin - Metalheadz
  Jubei - Patience VIP - Metalheadz
  Rido - Focus - Metalheadz
  Basher feat. Xtrah - Convulsions - Ram
  Mutated Forms - Doubts - Grid
  A Sides - One DJ - Clear Skyz
  Mark System feat. Youngman - Hold It - Digital Soundboy
  Icicle feat. Robert Owens - Redemption (Alix Perez Remix) - Shogun Audio
  Lenzman - Open Page (Subwave Remix) - Metalheadz
  dBridge - Cornered - Exit
  Jubei - Alignment (Boddika Remix) - Metalheadz
  Mikal - Higher Forces - Metalheadz
  Wickaman & RV - Ev's Dead - Ram
  J Majik & Wickaman - Old Headz - Metalheadz
  Commix - Be True - Metalheadz
  Goldie - Timeless - FFRR

References

External links
Fabric: FabricLive.58

Fabric (club) albums
2011 compilation albums